Romina Eduardovna Gabdullina (born 17 March 1993) is a Russian female badminton player. She won 2009 European Junior Badminton Championships in women's doubles event at Milan, Italy. In 2012, she became the runner-up of Iceland International tournament in women's singles event.

Achievements

European Junior Championships
Girls' Doubles

BWF International Challenge/Series
Women's Singles

Women's Doubles

 BWF International Challenge tournament
 BWF International Series tournament

References

External links
 

1993 births
Living people
Badminton players from Moscow
Russian female badminton players
21st-century Russian women